Dieter Weichert (born 5 March 1948) is a German mechanical engineer specialising in solid mechanics and polymer rheology. From 1995 to 2013 he was the Director of the Institute for General Mechanics of RWTH Aachen.

External links
Biography
Institute for General Mechanics of RWTH Aachen

1948 births
Living people
20th-century German engineers
Polymer scientists and engineers
Rheologists
21st-century German engineers
Place of birth missing (living people)